Daniel 'Dan' William Furnival (born 25 October 1978) is an English cricketer.  Furnival is a right-handed batsman who bowls leg break.  He was born in Ashford, Kent.

Furnival represented the Leicestershire Cricket Board in a single List A match against the Kent Cricket Board in the 2nd round of the 2002 Cheltenham & Gloucester Trophy which was held in 2001. In his only List A match he scored 9 runs.

He currently plays club cricket for Hythe Cricket Club in the Kent Cricket League.
In recent times he has become a renowned cricket tipster, with regular trips across the globe, advising betting syndicates. In one particular country he is known as लीमे लीजेंड which translates to: the limey legend.

References

External links
Daniel Furnival at Cricinfo
Daniel Furnival at CricketArchive

1978 births
Living people
People from Ashford, Kent
English cricketers
Leicestershire Cricket Board cricketers